Bittsevsky Park may refer to:
Bitsa Park, a natural park in southern Moscow
Bittsevsky Park (Butovskaya Line), a Moscow Metro station on the Butovskaya Light Metro Line
Novoyasenevskaya (Moscow Metro), a Moscow Metro station on the Kaluzhsko-Rizhskaya Line that was called Bittsevsky Park until 2009